The Centre for Software Reliability (CSR) is a distributed British organisation concerned with software reliability, including safety-critical issues. It consists of two sister organisations based at Newcastle University, UK. and City, University of London, London.

Up until August 2016 the centre ran the Safety-Critical Systems Club (SCSC) and the Software Reliability & Metrics Club. Since August 2016 the Safety-Critical Systems Club has been run by the department of Computer Science at the University of York.  The Club runs a number of events  each year including the annual Safety-Critical Systems Symposium (SSS).

CSR was founded in 1984 and has received UK and international research funding.

CSR members:
 Prof. Tom Anderson

References

External links 
 CSR Newcastle University website
 CSR City, University of London website

Organizations established in 1983
Computer science institutes in the United Kingdom
Newcastle University
City, University of London
Software engineering organizations
Software quality